Hopewell is a village in the Canadian province of Nova Scotia, in Pictou County.

One of Canada's first automobiles was manufactured at Hopewell in 1980. "The Nick " was a two-passenger buggy with iron tires, chain drive, and tiller steering.

Hopewell lies tucked in the valley of the East River, outside the towns of Stellarton and New Glasgow (TCH 104 Exit 24 and south on 374 out of Stellarton). One of many such communities that sprung up along the valley and were once joined by the railroad which delivered supplies and mail, the small community is the home of the Hopewell Footbridge, a municipal heritage site and one of the last surviving footbridges in North America. Hopewell is part of the beautiful East River Valley, a scenic pastoral area known for its colourful blueberry fields, winding river and lush farmlands.

The famous country music singer George Canyon grew up in Foxbrook, not far from the Hopewell. While he was participating on the reality television show "Nashville Star," his wife and two children continued to live in the community. Canyon still owns land in the area.

Hopewell has a rich Gaelic heritage. The "Maclean, Sinclair family fonds" collection came from the estate of George Maclean Sinclair, from Hopewell, in 1953. The contribution was then described as "the finest collection of original Gaelic material in Canada."

Further reading
Maynard, Steven. "Between Farm and Factory: The Productive Household and the Capitalist Transformation of the Maritime Countryside, Hopewell, Nova Scotia, 1869-1890." In Contested countryside: Rural Workers and Modern Society in Atlantic Canada,1800-1950 edited by Daniel Samson, 70-100. Fredericton, New Brunswick: Acadiensis Press, 1994.
The history of St. Columba Church : Hopewell, Nova Scotia. St. Columba Church (Hopewell, N.S.). 150th Anniversary Committee. Nova Scotia : St. Columba Church, Anniversary Committee, 1970. (NGP  REFCS) 277.163 His (found at the New Glasgow Library).
Geology of Hopewell map-area, Nova Scotia. Benson, David Gwyn, Ottawa : Dept. of Energy, Mines and Resources, 1967. REFCS 557.1 Ben (New Glasgow Library).
Frost, James D. (1982). "The 'Nationalization' of the Bank of Nova Scotia, 1880-1910." Acadiensis, 12(1), 3-38. Retrieved from http://journals.hil.unb.ca/index.php/Acadiensis/index

References

Communities in Pictou County
General Service Areas in Nova Scotia